Johanna Thydell, born 14 November 1980 in Nässjö, Sweden is a Swedish writer. Her 2003 book In the Ceiling the Stars Are Shining was given the August Prize.

Born in Nässjö, she grew up in Värnamo. After secondary school she attended a writer's course, and got contact with writer Magnus Utvik assisting her becoming a writer. She was a 2004 Sommar host. She studied at the writer's line course at Fridhems Folk High School in Svalöv and culture-courses focusing at literature and film at the Stockholm University.

Bibliography
2003 – In the Ceiling the Stars Are Shining ("I taket lyser stjärnorna")
2006 – Det fattas en tärning
2010 – Ursäkta att man vill bli lite älskad
2012 – There's a Pig in my Class! ("Det är en gris på dagis")
2017 - Dumma teckning!

Awards
2003 – Slangbellan
2003 – August Prize for In the Ceiling the Stars Are Shining
2003 – BMF Plaque
2007 – Partille Bookstore's Writer's Scholarship
2012 – BMF Plaque

References

External links

 

1980 births
Living people
Swedish women children's writers
Swedish children's writers